Civis or CIVIS may refer to:
civis, the Latin word for a (Roman) citizen
 Civís, a village in Spain
 Civis Media Prize
 Communauté intercommunale des Villes solidaires (CIVIS), an administrative structure in Réunion
 CIVIS, a type of train service on the Spanish Cercanías lines (for example on Cercanías Madrid)
 Irisbus Civis, a model of trolleybus produced by Iveco Bus

See also